Boophis anjanaharibeensis is a species of frog in the family Mantellidae.

It is endemic to Madagascar, officially known only from w:fr:Réserve Spéciale d’Anjanaharibe-Sud and unofficially from other areas including Marojejy National Park.
Its natural habitats are subtropical or tropical moist lowland forests, subtropical or tropical moist montane forests, and rivers.

It is threatened by habitat loss for agriculture, timber extraction, charcoal manufacturing, invasive eucalyptus, livestock grazing and expanding human settlements.

References

anjanaharibeensis
Amphibians described in 1996
Endemic frogs of Madagascar
Taxonomy articles created by Polbot